Patrick Thomas Stone (June 21, 1889 – January 13, 1963) was a United States district judge of the United States District Court for the Western District of Wisconsin.

Education and career

Born in Pembroke, Ontario, Canada, Stone received a Bachelor of Laws from Marquette University Law School in 1912. He was in private practice in Wausau, Wisconsin from 1912 to 1933. He served in the United States Navy during World War I. He was the city attorney of Wausau from 1921 to 1929.

Federal judicial service

Stone was nominated by President Franklin D. Roosevelt on June 9, 1933, to a seat on the United States District Court for the Western District of Wisconsin vacated by Judge Claude Luse. He was confirmed by the United States Senate on June 10, 1933, and received his commission on June 13, 1933. Stone served in that capacity until his death on January 13, 1963.

See also
Glasser v. United States

References

Sources
 

1889 births
1963 deaths
Judges of the United States District Court for the Western District of Wisconsin
United States district court judges appointed by Franklin D. Roosevelt
20th-century American judges
People from Pembroke, Ontario
People from Wausau, Wisconsin
Canadian emigrants to the United States
Marquette University alumni
Marquette University Law School alumni
United States Navy personnel of World War I
Military personnel from Wisconsin